The 1999 New York Jets season was the 40th season for the team, the 30th in the National Football League (NFL) and the third year and final year under Bill Parcells and was also the last season that the Jets were under the ownership of the Hess family. Owner Leon Hess died before the season began and, per his directive, the team was to be sold after his death. The process for vetting potential buyers proceeded during the entire season and shortly after it concluded, the winning buyer was revealed as Johnson & Johnson heir Woody Johnson.

The Jets failed to improve upon their 12–4 record from 1998, when the Jets won the AFC East and ended the season with a loss in the AFC Championship Game and missed the playoffs for the first time since 1997. The team dealt with several devastating injuries to starters. Starting quarterback Vinny Testaverde suffered a ruptured Achilles tendon in the season opener against the New England Patriots, costing him the entire season. Starting running back Leon Johnson tore two knee ligaments in the same game and was also lost for the season.

Due to Testaverde’s injury, the Jets were forced to use three different quarterbacks during the season. Parcells used punter Tom Tupa, who had begun his career as a quarterback, to replace Testaverde in the opening game against the Patriots but pulled him in favor of Rick Mirer. Parcells acquired Mirer in a trade with the Green Bay Packers during the offseason and made room for Mirer by trading Glenn Foley to the Seattle Seahawks. After a 2–6 start to the season, Parcells went in another direction and replaced Mirer with third-stringer Ray Lucas, who won six of his eight starts to bring the team to an 8–8 finish.

Parcells announced his retirement shortly after the 1999 season concluded and announced that defensive coordinator Bill Belichick, who had been his designated successor, would take over. However, Belichick decided shortly after taking the position that he no longer wanted it and instead chose to become the head coach of the Patriots. Thus, Parcells promoted linebackers coach Al Groh to replace him while he stayed on for an additional year in the front office.

Offseason

NFL draft

Roster

Schedule

Standings

References

External links 
 1999 team stats

New York Jets seasons
New York Jets
New York Jets season
20th century in East Rutherford, New Jersey
Meadowlands Sports Complex